Alexander Peter Pauk  (born October 4, 1945) is a Canadian conductor and composer, most noted as the founder of the Esprit Orchestra.

Awards and nominations
At the Juno Awards of 1996, both Alexina Louie and Harry Freedman received Juno nominations for Classical Composition of the Year, for works they had composed for the Esprit Orchestra album Music for Heaven and Earth, and Harry Somers was nominated at the Juno Awards of 2001 for "The Third Piano Concerto", from the Esprit Orchestra album Celebration. Pauk and the Esprit Orchestra were themselves nominees for Classical Album of the Year (Large Ensemble or Soloist(s) with Large Ensemble Accompaniment) at the Juno Awards of 1998, for Tabuh-Tabuhan, Music of Colin McPhee. 

In 1999, Pauk and Louie received a Genie Award nomination for Best Original Score at the 19th Genie Awards, for their work on the film Last Night.

In 2007, he was a recipient of the Canada Council's Molson Prize for distinguished achievement in the arts.

In 2014, he was inducted as a Member of the Order of Canada for his contributions to Canadian orchestral music and longstanding support and fostering of new music and early career composers.

Compositions
Fragmentations, 1971
Fibro for viola solo, 1973
Magaru for flute, viola and percussion, 1973
The Scroll, 1974
Solari, 1977
Echo Spirit Isle, 1983
Mirage, 1984
Split Seconds, 1988
Cosmos, 1988
Concerto for Two Pianos and Orchestra, 2001
Touch Piece, 2003
Concerto for Harp and Orchestra, 2005

Film scores
The Life and Times of Edwin Alonzo Boyd, 1982
At the Wheel: Under the Influence (Facultés affaiblies), 1985
At the Wheel: After the Crash (Sous le coup du choc), 1985
Martha, Ruth and Edie, 1988 (with Alexina Louie)
See No Evil, 1988 (with Louie)
Last Night, 1988 (with Louie)
The Five Senses, 1999 (with Louie)
24fps, 2000 (with Louie)
Perfect Pie, 2002 (with Louie)
Inside Hana's Suitcase, 2009 (with Louie)

References

1945 births
Living people
20th-century Canadian composers
21st-century Canadian composers
Canadian classical composers
Canadian film score composers
Canadian male classical composers
Musicians from Toronto
Members of the Order of Canada